Thesmophora is a genus of flowering plants in the family Stilbaceae described as a genus in 1993.

There is only one known species, Thesmophora scopulosa, native to the Cape Province region in South Africa.

See also
John Patrick Rourke

References

Monotypic Lamiales genera
Stilbaceae
Endemic flora of South Africa